The champions and runners-up of the All England Open Badminton Championships Mixed Doubles tournament, first introduced to the championship in 1899. From 1915 to 1919, and from 1940 to 1946, no competition was held due to the two World Wars.

History
In the Amateur era, George Alan Thomas (1903, 1906-1907, 1911, 1914, 1920-1922), Betty Uber (1930-1936, 1938) and Finn Kobberø (1955, 1957, 1960-1963, 1965-1966) jointly holds the record for the most titles in the Mixed Doubles, winning All England eight times. Betty Uber holds the record for most consecutive titles with seven from 1930 to 1936.

Since the Open era of badminton began in late 1979 with the inclusion of professional badminton players from around the world in 1980, Chung Myung-hee and Park Joo-bong (1989-1991), Gao Ling (2006-2008), Tontowi Ahmad and Liliyana Natsir (2012-2014), share the record for most consecutive victories with three.

Gillian Perrin, Nora Gardner, Mike Tredgett, Steen Skovgaard, Christian Hadinata and Imelda Wiguna are the only players in history to reach the All England Open Badminton Mixed Doubles Final in both the Amateur and Open era. Gilks managed to do so a total of nine times, winning four, Gardner ten, Tredgett six, both winning twice, Skovgaard twice but never won and Hadinata, partnering Wiguna, thrice but winless in the Open era.

Finalists

Amateur era

Open era

Statistics

Multiple titles
Bold indicates active players.

Champions by country

Multiple finalists

Notes

Many female badminton players change their surname after marriage. Below are some of the former names  or latest names as noted in the table above: 
 – Margaret Tragett formerly known as Margaret Larminie
 – Tonny Ahm formerly known as Tonny Olsen
 – Ulla Strand formerly known as Ulla Rasmussen
 – Gillian Gilks formerly known as Gillian Perrin and later known as Gillian Goodwin

See also
 List of All England men's singles champions
 List of All England women's singles champions
 List of All England men's doubles champions
 List of All England women's doubles champions

References

External links
 All England Champions 1899-2007
 BadmintonEngland.co.uk
 badmintoneurope.com
 

All England Open Badminton Championships